Renegades of the Rio Grande is a 1945 American Western film about a crooked financier and a corrupt sheriff that conspire to steal land from ranchers in Oklahoma Territory for the purposes of a railroad right-of-way. A young lawyer, Clint Farrell, comes to the rescue with the aid of some fighting-mad ranchers. Howard Bretherton directed the film and Ande Lamb wrote the screenplay.

Cast
Rod Cameron as Buck Emerson
Eddie Dew as Ranger Cal Benedict
Fuzzy Knight as Ranger Trigger Bidwell
Jennifer Holt as Dolores Salezar
Ray Whitley as Tex Henry
The Bar-6 Cowboys as Singing ranch hands
Glenn Strange as Bart Drummond
Edmund Cobb as Karl Holbrook.

External links

1945 films
Universal Pictures films
1945 Western (genre) films
American Western (genre) films
American black-and-white films
1940s American films